Kutton ( also known as Jagran Valley ) is a village and a tourist resort in Neelam Valley of Azad Kashmir administered by Pakistan.
Kutton is accessible by Neelam road from Muzaffarabad branches off from Kundal Shahi.

Rest houses of AJK Tourism and Archeology Department and Water and Power Development Authority (WAPDA) are located here. Some private rest houses and hotels are also available here for tourists stay.

See also
Athmuqam
Keran
Sharda
Kel

References

Populated places in Neelam District
Hill stations in Pakistan
2005 Kashmir earthquake
Tourist attractions in Azad Kashmir